Coddingtown Mall is one of two enclosed shopping malls in Santa Rosa, California. Opened in 1962, the mall is anchored by JCPenney, Macy's, Nordstrom Rack, Target, and Whole Foods Market. It is fully owned and operated by Codding Enterprises.

History

Founding
Coddingtown Mall was built in 1962 by Hugh Codding. Originally an open-air mall, it was enclosed in 1979. The expansion also added Liberty House, which was converted to Macy's in 1984. In 1996, Macy's moved to a spot previously occupied by The Emporium. As a result, Gottschalks moved into the former Liberty House/Macy's building. Codding sold a 50% share of the mall to Simon Property Group in 2005. After the sale to Simon, many merchants criticized Simon for failing to bring chain stores to the mall. A Ralphs supermarket in the mall was demolished in 2008 for a Whole Foods Market, whose opening was ultimately delayed until 2010, and Gottschalks closed in 2009.

Modern history
In November 2012, the former Gottschalks building was demolished to make way for a Target store, which opened in 2014. Mall officials announced in 2015 that a new building for Nordstrom Rack would replace the section housing merchants including Bank of the West and Baskin-Robbins, several of which were moved to new units. Nordstrom Rack opened in 2016.

In December 2017, the mall returned to fully local ownership after the Codding family business repurchased the 50% stake in the shopping center previously owned by mall giant Simon Property Group.

On March 11, 2019, a woman was shot and killed in her car outside the Crunch Fitness gym. The shooter, her husband, then drove to his home and killed himself.

In popular culture
In 1997, the San Francisco-based band Primus released the song "Coddingtown" as part of the Brown Album. According to the song, "you can get it all down there from tennis balls to glue".

References

1962 establishments in California
Buildings and structures in Santa Rosa, California
Shopping malls in the San Francisco Bay Area
Shopping malls established in 1962
Simon Property Group
Economy of Santa Rosa, California